The Lost Tapes is the eighth studio album by British girl group Sugababes and their first independent release. While work for the album dates back to 2011 when the original lineup reunited, the album remained unreleased until its 24 December 2022 digital release. The Lost Tapes is the second Sugababes album to feature the original lineup after 2000's One Touch. The deluxe version, which included an additional three tracks, was released digitally on 31 December 2022. The Lost Tapes debuted at number two on the UK Digital Albums chart and number 13 on the UK Independent Albums Chart.

Background

In 2009, the line-up of the Sugababes featured Keisha Buchanan, Heidi Range and Amelle Berrabah and they were gearing up for the release of their seventh album Sweet 7 in early 2010. However, prior to the album's release, it was confirmed that Buchanan was leaving the group in September 2009. Shortly after original member Mutya Buena won the legal rights to use the name Sugababes under Class 16 of the EU Trademark Act, both Buena and Buchanan individually tweeted about recording in the studio. Buchanan said she was in the studio with "two other females" and British rapper Professor Green, while Buena separately tweeted "Tunnnnnnnnne! What a banger. I could pee myself with excitment lol but I won't. ". Both Buena and Buchanan denied that they were in the studio together and said that they were not working on music for the Sugababes, with Buena saying: "No track [with] keisha or professor G he was around tha studio. im jus workin on my stuff @ tha moment. [sic]" Despite this, Scottish singer-songwriter Emeli Sandé confirmed to MTV UK that she had written new songs for Buena, Buchanan and Siobhán Donaghy, saying: "Yes, that is true. I've written for the original line-up of the Sugababes, which I'm very happy about because I just loved them when they first came out. I loved their sound, it was so cool. It was very different, so I'm happy to kind of be involved in what started the whole Sugababes journey. It sounds amazing." The Lost Tapes is the second Sugababes album to feature the original lineup, after 2000's One Touch.

In April 2012, it was reported that the line-up had signed a £1 million record deal with Polydor Records. In July 2012, it was officially confirmed that the group had reformed under the name Mutya Keisha Siobhan and were writing songs for a new album under Polydor.  The group enlisted Naughty Boy, MNEK, Sia and Shaznay Lewis as collaborators for the album. Speaking of working with the group, MNEK said, "I'd just turned 17 when Felix Howard messaged me to say that the original Sugababes are singing together again and I want you to write with them'. I wasn't gonna say no was I ". According to the singer-producer, the song "Today" was supposed to be the first single. MNEK also worked on "Drum" and the song "Boys" with Richard "Biff" Stannard.

The album's original title was reportedly The Sacred Three, after the band's comeback concert tour. A song originally recorded for the album "Love in Stereo" went on to be recorded by Bananarama on their album In Stereo (2019). Buchanan said in an interview that the group were working on new material after their previous work was leaked online. Amongst the first songs to leak was a version of the song "Back in the Day" which sampled the song of the same name by Ahmad in February 2015. A year later, several other songs leaked to varying degrees of finished production, including: "Boys", "Love in Stereo", "Today", "No Regrets", "Summer of '99", "Too in Love", "I'm Alright" and "Drum". Another song "Burn Out" also leaked, which was later reclaimed by its writer Tom Aspaul. The group had also uploaded a song called "Lay Down in Swimming Pools" which sampled the Kendrick Lamar song "Swimming Pools (Drank)" to their SoundCloud account at the end of a studio session with Dev Hynes. This song would later be reworked with a new instrumental to become The Lost Tapes song "I Lay Down".

Music and lyrics
The album includes '80s-inspired pop, which is most present on the single "Flatline", initially released in June 2013, pop rock influences as seen on "Summer of '99", and elements of breakbeat, which is notable on songs such as "Today."

The song "Boys" features on the album, which a short a cappella clip was uploaded of on Buchanan's YouTube account in January 2013. The clip quickly attracted attention, surpassing over 100,000 views. The same day, Popjustice released a three-second clip of the studio version of the single, calling it "simply amazing". A handful of the songs included on the album, namely "I'm Alright", "Love Me Hard", "Today" and "No Regrets" were previously performed by the trio at their first official headline gig at the Scala nightclub on 1 August 2013. "Flatline" and "Today" were amongst the songs performed throughout their various festival performances and headline tour in 2022.

Promotion and release 
"Flatline" was originally released on 6 September 2013 under the Mutya Keisha Siobhan name through Polydor Records. The single was re-released on 9 June 2022 independently under the Sugababes name. The Sugababes announced the surprise release of The Lost Tapes on social media, stating "We wrote this album almost 8 years ago and for various reasons it didn't get an official release, so it's with great pride that The Lost Tapes is available now on all streaming platforms". The group confirmed that they had released the album independently, and were in control of its rollout.

Tour

Though not formally announced to promote The Lost Tapes, the Sugababes went on tour across the UK in October and November 2022. The group performed songs spanning all of the line-ups and were supported by London singer Kara Marni.  The setlist also included songs "Today" and "Love Me Hard" from The Lost Tapes, which at the time  of the tour were officially unreleased. According to Buchanan, former Sugababes members Range and Berrabah are supporting the group from afar.

Set list
The set list is taken from Norwich show at The Nick Rayns LCR, it is not intended to represent every date of the tour.

"Push the Button"
"Red Dress"
"Hole in the Head"
"Too Lost in You"
"Flatline"
"2 Hearts"
"Today"
"Ugly"
"Love Me Hard"
"Stronger"
"Same Old Story" (Interlude)
"Overload"
"Garage Medley"
"Flowers" (Sweet Female Attitude cover)
"Round Round"
"Freak Like Me"
"About You Now"

Dates

Commercial performance
After five days of tracking, The Lost Tapes debuted at number two on the UK Album Downloads Chart and at number 13 on the UK Independent Albums Chart. After the deluxe version of the album was released, the tracks "Back to Life", "Only You" and "Breathe Me" charted at numbers 49, 58 and 62, on the UK Singles Downloads Chart on 6 January 2023.

Track listing

Notes
"Back in the Day" interpolates the song of the same name by Ahmad.
"Breathe Me" is a cover of the song of the same name by Sia, written by Sia and Dan Carey.

Charts

Release history

References

2022 albums
Sugababes albums
Albums produced by Dev Hynes
Albums produced by Richard Stannard (songwriter)
Albums produced by Stargate
2022 concert tours